Isles of the Seven Sins, more commonly known as Siete Pecados, is a group of seven rocky islets located between the towns of Buenavista, Guimaras and Dumangas, Iloilo. The group's highest point only reaches 8 meters. It is north of Guimaras and south of the island of Panay. It is a developing tourist attraction together with another small islet called Roca Enchantada (or Enchanted Rock) some distance away towards the shore.

References

Islands of Guimaras